The Springfield Stallions were an indoor football team that played their home games in Springfield, Illinois.  They were a 2007 expansion member of the Continental Indoor Football League. The Stallions played their home football games at the Prairie Capital Convention Center which is located in downtown Springfield. It has a seating capacity of 6,500 for football games.

This was the inaugural season for the Stallions at the professional level. There had previously been a semi-pro team in Springfield called the Stallions in 2006 which played for the 8FL. While the current Stallions ownership maintained the rights to the original franchise (and maintained a few players from the semi-pro team) the current Stallions' history was not considered a continuation of the original team's. The team was originally coached by Kevin Gade. They did sign former professional NFL or other professional indoor league players like Winston Taylor, Kevin Galbreath and Freddie Weinke 

The Stallions one season in the CIFL ended with a few weeks remaining in the season. The owners of the team, disappeared three weeks into the season leaving management and the coaching staff to try and scrape together a team for the remainder of the season, leaving numerous outstanding debts to sponsors, the Prairie Capitol Convention Center, and all players and coaches. Many players and coaches never received a paycheck. 

Following a teleconference involving remaining management and the league office, the team ended operations before the conclusion of the 2007 season.  The semi-pro 8-man football team, the Capital City Outlaws, replaced the Stallions for one game against the Chicago Slaughter, only to be blown out 61-6.

Season-By-Season 

|-
|2007 || 0 || 12 || 0 || 8th Great Lakes || --

2007 Season Schedule

 - "Stallions" team was actually fielded by the league and was not the actual Stallions team from Springfield.

2007 CIFL Standings

References

External links
 Official Website
 Stallions' 2007 Stats

American football teams in Illinois
Former Continental Indoor Football League teams
Stallions
American football teams established in 2006
American football teams disestablished in 2007
2006 establishments in Illinois
2007 disestablishments in Illinois